General Robbie Wijting (29 June 1925 – 27 August 1986) was a Dutch military officer who served as highest-ranking member of the Dutch Armed Forces between 1973 and 1980. First as Chairman of the United Defence Staff of the Armed Forces of the Netherlands between 1973 and 1976. And served, after the renaming of the position, as Chiefs of the Defence Staff between 1976 and 1980.

References

External links 
 

1925 births
1986 deaths
Royal Netherlands Air Force generals
Royal Netherlands Air Force officers
Chiefs of the Defence Staff (Netherlands)